The Swiss Gambit is a chess opening which is an offshoot of Bird's Opening (1.f4) and begins with the moves:

1. f4 f5
2. e4

Published theory
The following were the main lines of the Swiss Gambit given by F. A. Lange in 1859: 
2...fxe4 3.Qh5+ 
2...fxe4 3.f5
2...fxe4 3.Bc4
2...fxe4 3.Nc3 Nf6 4.d3

Polish theoretician Alexander Wagner (1868–1942) published an article entitled A New Gambit. The Swiss Gambit in 1912. The Wagner Gambit begins with the moves: 1.f4 f5 2.e4 fxe4 3.Nc3 Nf6 4.g4.

Other uses

The term "Swiss Gambit" is also used colloquially to describe a strategy for Swiss system tournaments. In a "Swiss Gambit", a player loses or draws against weaker players early in the tournament, in the hope of being paired against weaker opposition in later rounds and finishing in the prize money.

See also
 List of chess openings
 List of chess openings named after places

References

Chess openings